Rosario Olivo (born 18 April 1940, in Catanzaro) is an Italian politician.

A long-time member of the Italian Socialist Party (PSI), he joined the Labour Federation (FL) in 1994 and the Democrats of the Left (DS) in 1998.

He was deputy from 1992 to 2001 and served as the President of Calabria from 1987 to 1992. In 2006, he was elected mayor of Catanzaro.

He is a Waldensian.

References

1940 births
Living people
Presidents of Calabria
Italian Christian socialists
Italian Waldensians
People from Catanzaro
Calvinist and Reformed Christian socialists
Mayors of places in Calabria
Italian Socialist Party politicians
Democrats of the Left politicians
Democratic Party (Italy) politicians